Robert Lima Guimarães (born 2 January 1987), commonly known as Robert Gladiador, is a Brazilian footballer who last plays as a forward for Arema.

Career statistics

Club

Notes

Honours

Club

Al-Shabab
 Kuwaiti Division One: 2017–18

Arema
 Indonesia President's Cup: 2019

References

1987 births
Living people
Brazilian footballers
Brazilian expatriate footballers
Association football forwards
Cruzeiro Esporte Clube players
Uberlândia Esporte Clube players
Jiangsu F.C. players
América Futebol Clube (MG) players
Esporte Clube Democrata players
Esporte Clube Bahia players
Ipatinga Futebol Clube players
Sociedade Esportiva e Recreativa Caxias do Sul players
Sport Club Corinthians Alagoano players
Clube Esportivo Lajeadense players
Esporte Clube Passo Fundo players
Sport Club São Paulo players
Esporte Clube Pelotas players
Clube Esportivo Bento Gonçalves players
Rio Branco Atlético Clube players
Sociedade Esportiva Recreativa e Cultural Brasil players
Clube Atlético Itapemirim players
Vitória Futebol Clube (ES) players
Estrela do Norte Futebol Clube players
Arema F.C. players
Brazilian expatriate sportspeople in China
Expatriate footballers in China
Brazilian expatriate sportspeople in Saudi Arabia
Expatriate footballers in Saudi Arabia
Brazilian expatriate sportspeople in Kuwait
Expatriate footballers in Kuwait
Brazilian expatriate sportspeople in Indonesia
Expatriate footballers in Indonesia
Al-Shabab SC (Kuwait) players
Kuwait Premier League players